Johannes Sass (also in German: Saß) born  in Hamburg, died ) was a linguist who specialized in the Low German language. He obtained his doctorate in 1926 from the University of Hamburg.

Significance in Low German 
Although Low German has no official written form, Sass's dictionary of the language holds a similar authoritative place for the language that the Duden dictionary does for the Standard High German language.

The diverse writing systems for Low German caused Sass to develop his spelling rules which he published in 1935. In 1956 this led to the Fehrs-Gilde, an organization promoting the Low German language, producing the 'Rules for Low German spelling', which mainly followed the example of the orthography laid down by Sass.

The Johannes-Saß-Preis (Johannes Sass Prize) for scientific works about Low German is named after Sass.

Low German
Linguists from Germany
1889 births
1971 deaths
German lexicographers
20th-century linguists
20th-century lexicographers
University of Hamburg alumni